The Province of Vaasa (Sweden ) was a province of Finland, established in 1775 when Finland was an integrated part of Sweden from the southern part of Ostrobothnia County and disbanded in 1996. The province was named after the city of Vaasa.

On the death of Tsar Nicholas I in 1855, a small group of citizens in the city of Vaasa tendered a petition to change the name of the city after him. The name of the city came from the Royal House of Vasa and despite that only 15 citizens were backing the proposal the name of the city was changed to Nikolaistad.

In 1960 the eastern part was separated as the Province of Central Finland. In 1997 it was reunited with Central Finland, together they merged with the northern part of the Province of Häme and the Province of Turku and Pori to establish the new Province of Western Finland. 

The former province corresponds to the current regions of Ostrobothnia, Central Ostrobothnia and Southern Ostrobothnia.

Maps

Municipalities in 1997 (cities in bold) 

 Alahärmä
 Alajärvi
 Alavus
 Evijärvi
 Halsua
 Himanka
 Ilmajoki
 Isojoki
 Isokyrö
 Jakobstad
 Jalasjärvi
 Jurva
 Kannus
 Karijoki
 Kaskinen
 Kauhajoki
 Kauhava
 Kaustinen
 Kokkola
 Korsnäs
 Kortesjärvi
 Kristinestad
 Kronoby
 Kuortane
 Kurikka
 Kälviä
 Laihia
 Lappajärvi
 Lapua
 Larsmo
 Lehtimäki
 Lestijärvi
 Lohtaja
 Malax
 Maxmo
 Korsholm
 Nurmo
 Nykarleby
 Närpes
 Oravais
 Pedersöre
 Perho
 Peräseinäjoki
 Seinäjoki
 Soini
 Teuva
 Toholampi
 Töysä
 Ullava
 Vaasa
 Veteli
 Vimpeli
 Vähäkyrö
 Vörå
 Ylihärmä
 Ylistaro
 Ähtäri

Former municipalities (disestablished before 1997) 

 Bergö
 Björköby
 Esse
 Jeppo
 Karleby landskommun
 Kvevlax
 Lappfjärd
 Munsala
 Nedervetil
 Nykarleby landskommun
 Petalax
 Purmo
 Pörtom
 Replot
 Seinäjoen mlk
 Sideby
 Solf
 Terjärv
 Tjöck
 Öja
 Övermark

Governors

Bror Cederström 1775–1785
Adolf Tandefeldt 1785–1794
Carl Fridrik Krabbe 1794–1805
Magnus Wanberg 1805–1808
Nils Fredric von Schoultz 1808
Carl Constantin de Carnall 1808–1822
Herman Henrik Wärnhjelm 1822–1830
Gustaf Magnus Armfelt 1830–1832
Carl Gustaf von Mannerheim 1832–1833 (acting) and 1833–1834
Carl Olof Cronstedt 1834–1837 (acting) and 1837-1845
John Ferdinand Bergenheim 1845–1847
Berndt Federley 1847–1854
Alexander von Rechenberg 1854–1858
Otto Leonard von Blom 1858–1861
Carl Gustaf Fabian Wrede 1862–1863 (vt.) and 1863–1884
Viktor Napoleon Procopé 1884–1888
August Alexander Järnefelt 1888–1894
Fredrik Waldemar Schauman 1894–1898
Gustaf Axel von Kothen 1898–1900
Fredrik Geronimo Björnberg 1900–1903
Theodor Knipovitsch 1903–1906
Kasten Fredrik Ferdinand de Pont 1906–1910
Bernhard Otto Widnäs 1910–1913
Nikolai Sillman 1913–1916
Leo Aristides Sirelius 1916–1917
Juho Torppa 1917 (acting)
Teodor August Heikel 1917–1920
Bruno Sarlin 1920–1930
Erik Heinrichs 1930
Kaarlo Martonen 1930–1938
Jalo Lahdensuo 1938–1943
Toivo Tarjanne 1943–1944
K. G. R. Ahlbäck 1944–1967
Martti Viitanen 1967–1977
Antti Pohjonen 1977–1978
Mauno Kangasniemi 1978–1991
Tom Westergård 1991–1997

Provinces of Finland (1917–97)